In hydrology, oasification is the antonym to desertification by soil erosion. This technique has limited application and is normally considered for much smaller areas than those threatened by desertification.

To help the oasification process, engineers aim to develop a thriving dense woody plant cover to redress the hydrological, edaphic and botanical degradation affecting a slope.  This is done through appropriate soil preparation and the introduction of suitable plant species.  It is also necessary to make adequate water harvesting systems—ideally taking advantage of the degradation process of the slope, collecting runoff water in ponds around the sites to be forested.

The term "oasification" was coined in 1999 by Andrés Martínez de Azagra Paredes, PhD Forest Engineer and professor on Hydraulics and Forest Hydrology at E.T.S. of Agroforestry Engineering in Palencia, University of Valladolid, Spain.

In oasification, soil and nutrient harvesting are regarded as fundamental component parts in the reclamation process of a degraded slope.  Besides harvesting water, oasification preserves and accumulates soil and nutrients, helping to control water erosion—a common problem in dry climates. Ludwig et al. (1997) reported about sloping areas under semiarid conditions in Australia where the landscape is naturally divided into source and sink zones (surface runoff and run-on areas), which are sometimes reclaimed by plant species through retention of water soil and litter.

See also 
 Desert greening
 Syntropic agriculture
 Rainwater harvesting
 Brad Lancaster

References 
 Martínez de Azagra Paredes, A. (1999): El modelo hidrológico MODIPÉ. Montes, 55: 77 – 82
 Ludwig, J.; Tongway, D.; Freudenberger, D.; Noble, J. y Hodgkinson, K. (1997): Landscape ecology. Function and management. CSIRO. Collingwood (Australia)

External links 
 Oasification web-site
 	

Aquatic ecology
Desert greening
Hydrology